The Old Maid is a 1935 play by American playwright Zoë Akins, adapted from Edith Wharton's 1924 novella of the same name. Directed by Guthrie McClintic and starring Judith Anderson and Helen Menken, the play opened January 7, 1935, at the Empire Theatre on Broadway, and ran for 305 performances. The play was awarded the Pulitzer Prize for Drama.

The play was adapted for a 1939 Warner Bros. film starring Bette Davis and Miriam Hopkins.

References

External links
 
1946 Theatre Guild on the Air radio adaptation at Internet Archive

1935 plays
Broadway plays
Pulitzer Prize for Drama-winning works
Plays based on novels
Plays set in New York City